Nikolaus (Anton) Graf Szécsen von Temerin (26 November  1857 – 18 May 1926), was an Austro-Hungarian diplomat of Hungarian origin serving as ambassador at Paris at the outbreak of World War I.

Life 
Born in Temerin on 26 November 1857 into the Hungarian nobility as son of Anton Graf Szécsen von Temerin (1819–1896), an Austro-Hungarian government minister. In 1896, he married Johanna Gräfin Mikes von Zabola (1866–1930) in Vienna.

Count Szécsen joined the Austro-Hungarian foreign service and served inter alia in Rome. In November 1895, he was appointed Second Section Chief at the Foreign Ministry in Vienna and was promoted to First Section Chief in January 1900. At the insistence of Count Tisza, he was appointed despite his relatively limited experience to serve as the Dual Monarchy's ambassador to the Holy See in November 1901, a prominent posting given the close connections between the House of Habsburg and the papacy.

Count Szécsen, considered an able diplomat with a "solid, practical mind and a masterful grasp of the workings of diplomacy", apparently turned down an offer to succeed Count von Aehrenthal as ambassador to St. Petersburg upon the latter's appointment as Minister of Foreign Affairs in 1906.

In early January 1911, Count Szécsen was appointed as ambassador to France, considered one of the most prestigious ambassadorships at the time, and presented his credentials on 21 March. In that capacity, he played a key role during the July Crisis in 1914. After returning to Vienna, he became a member of the Upper House (Herrenhaus) in 1916 and served as a Hofmarschall in Hungary from 1916 to 1918.

Count Szécsen had been invested as a Knight of the Order of the Golden Fleece in 1908.

His son Nikolaus was executed by Russian soldiers at Mór, Hungary, on 28 March 1945.

Count Szécsen died in Gyöngyösszentkereszt on 18 May 1926.

Notes

References

External links
 'Nikolaus Graf Szécsen von Temerin', Solving Problems Through Force
 'Szécsen Miklós, gróf', Magyar Életrajzi Lexikon

1857 births
1926 deaths
Austro-Hungarian diplomats of World War I
Austro-Hungarian diplomats
Austrian diplomats
Hungarian diplomats
Hungarian nobility
Knights of the Golden Fleece of Austria
Ambassadors of Austria-Hungary to the Holy See
Ambassadors of Austria-Hungary to France